Sophie Williams is a fencer.

Sophie Williams may also refer to:

Sophie-May Williams, singer
Sophie Williams, character in Post Captain (novel)